Lei Muk Shue West is one of the 19 constituencies in the Tsuen Wan District. It covers the west part of Lei Muk Shue Estate.

The constituency returns one district councillor to the Tsuen Wan District Council, with an election every four years.

Lei Muk Shue West constituency has estimated population of 17,296.

Councillors represented

Election results

2010s

References

Constituencies of Hong Kong
Constituencies of Tsuen Wan District Council
1999 establishments in Hong Kong
Constituencies established in 1999
Tsuen Wan